The Škoda 1200 is a family car produced by Czechoslovakian automaker AZNP at their plant in Mladá Boleslav. Sedan and station wagons versions were offered. The car appeared in 1952 as a successor to the  Škoda 1101. It was the first mass-produced Škoda to use the steel ponton format body.  

The car was powered by a four-cylinder 1213 cc OHV water-cooled engine producing at maximum power  at 4,200 rpm. The four-speed gear box included synchromesh on the top three ratios, power being delivered to the rear wheels via a jointed prop shaft. The front suspension is independent using transverse leaf springs while the rear suspension is independent using transverse leaf springs with floating half-axles.

The 1200 was available as a four-door saloon, three-door van or five-door station wagon. There were also about 2,000 ambulances.  

Production ended in 1956.

References

External links

 http://www.conceptcarz.com/vehicle/z6514/Skoda-1200.aspx

1200
Cars introduced in 1952